The first season of the American television series La Piloto, created by Jörg Hiller, follows the story of Yolanda Cadena (Livia Brito) and all her efforts to become an airplane pilot.

The season was ordered in May 2016, and filming began on 5 September 2016. The season stars Livia Brito as Yolanda Cadena, Arap Bethke as John Lucio, María Fernanda Yepes as Zulima Montes, Alejandro Nones as Óscar Lucio, María de la Fuente as Mónica Ortega, Verónica Montes as Lizbeth Álvarez, Natasha Domínguez as Amanda Cuadrado, María Fernanda García as Estela Lesmes, Mauricio Aspe as Arley Mena, Stephanie Salas as Rosalba, Arturo Barba as Zeky Gilmas, Tommy Vásquez as Coronel Santamaría, Macarena Achaga as Olivia, and Juan Colucho as Dave Mejía.

The first season began airing on 7 March 2017, and concluded on 26 June 2017.

Cast

Main 
 Livia Brito as Yolanda Cadena, the series' protagonist, her dream is to become an airplane pilot.
 Arap Bethke as John Lucio, he is an airplane pilot, has an airplane company with his brother Oscar and uses it as a front for his illicit business. He teaches Yolanda everything about aviation.
 María Fernanda Yepes as Zulima Montes, she is the best friend of Yolanda, who works for Central America Air as a stewardess.
 Alejandro Nones as Óscar Lucio, he's John's brother.
 María de la Fuente as Mónica Ortega, she is assisting Dave in the DEA's investigation and the Mexican government against Central America Air and the Lucio brothers.
 Verónica Montes as Lizbeth Álvarez, she is one of Yolanda's aides, working as a stewardess in Central America Air.
 Natasha Domínguez as Amanda Cuadrado, she is one of Yolanda's aides, working as a stewardess in Central America Air and for Yolanda as her helper to commit illicit business.
 María Fernanda García as Estela Lesmes, she is Yolanda's mom.
 Mauricio Aspe as Arley Mena, he is one of the helpers of the Lucio brothers, Amanda's lover and Guillermo's father.
 Stephanie Salas as Rosalba Cadena, she is Yolanda's aunt.
 Arturo Barba as Zeky Gilmas, he is the main manager of Central América Air and partner of the Lucio brothers.
 Tommy Vásquez as Arnoldo Santamaría, he is a Colombian guerrilla lieutenant.
 Macarena Achaga as Olivia Nieves, she is Yolanda's chief of security and help with the use of weapons.
 Juan Colucho as Dave Mejía, he is an agent of the DEA that tries to imprison the Lucio brothers and to eliminate the company Central America Air.

Recurring 
 Jean Paul Leroux as Commissioner of the Cártel de las Sombras
 Shalim Ortiz as Dean Simpson, corrupt agent infiltrated in the DEA.
 Andrés Delgado as Cristian Nieves, Olivia's brother.
 Rolando Brito as Capitán Argüelles, corrupt commander.
 Marcelo Buquet as Omar Nieves, Olivia's father.
 Gerardo Murguía as Jorge Sinisterra
 Adriana Nieto as Sinisterra's wife
 David Palacio as Alberto Rubio

Special guest stars 
 Antonio de la Vega as Ramón Cadena, Yolanda's father.

Episodes

References 

2017 Mexican television seasons
2017 American television seasons